The 2020–21 Richmond Spiders men's basketball team represented the University of Richmond during the 2020–21 NCAA Division I men's basketball season. They were led by 16th-year head coach Chris Mooney and played their home games at the Robins Center as members of the Atlantic 10 Conference. They finished  the season 14-9, 6-5 in A-10 play to finish in 8th place. They lost in the quarterfinals of the A-10 tournament to Duquesne. They received an invitation to the NIT where they defeated Toledo in the first round before losing in the quarterfinals to Mississippi State.

Previous season
The Spiders finished the 2019–20 season 24–7, 14–4 in A-10 play to finish in second place. Their season ended when the A-10 tournament and all other postseason tournaments were canceled due to the ongoing coronavirus pandemic.

Offseason

Departures

In addition, guard Nick Sherod suffered a season-ending knee injury during preseason practice in October 2020.

Incoming transfer
Guard Connor Crabtree transferred to Richmond from Tulane prior to the 2019–20 season and sat out due to NCAA transfer rules. He will become eligible to play for the Spiders in the 2020–21 season.

2020 recruiting class

Weir left the program in December 2020 before he played in any games for the Spiders.

Preseason
In a preseason poll of league head coaches and select media members, Richmond was chosen as the favorite to win the Atlantic 10 Conference in 2020–21, taking 19 out of 28 first-place votes. Jacob Gilyard was selected to both the preseason all-conference first team and the preseason all-defensive team, while Blake Francis and Grant Golden were both selected to the preseason all-conference second team.

Roster

Schedule and results
The Spiders' opening game of the season against Detroit Mercy as part of the Bluegrass Showcase was canceled due to COVID-19 issues within the Detroit Mercy program. Two other non-conference games against Charleston and Furman were canceled due to a COVID-related pause by Richmond.

Richmond experienced two additional COVID-related pauses during the season, resulting in multiple changes to the Atlantic 10 portion of the schedule, while adjustments to the schedule for the 2021 Atlantic 10 men's basketball tournament resulted in additional changes to several teams' schedules over the final two weeks of the regular season.

|-
!colspan=12 style=| Regular season

|-
!colspan=9 style=| A-10 tournament

|-
!colspan=9 style=| NIT

Sources:

Rankings

*Coaches did not release a Week 1 poll

References

Richmond
Richmond Spiders men's basketball seasons
Richmond Spiders men's basketball
Richmond Spiders men's basketball
Richmond